"All We Got" is a song by German DJ and record producer Robin Schulz, featuring vocals from Swedish singer-songwriter Kiddo. The song was released on 16 October 2020 as the sixth single from his fourth studio album IIII (2021). The song was written by Alessandra Günthardt, Daniel Deimann, Fredrik Samsson, Guido Kramer, Jürgen Dohr, Oliver Lundström, Robin Schulz, Stefan Dabruck and Kiddo.

Music video
The official music video of the song was released on 16 October 2020 through Robin Schulz's YouTube account. The music video was directed by Maxim Rosenbauer and Moritz Ross. It was filmed in Bucharest, Romania, and stars athletes Andrada Craciun and Olivia Cîmpian as rival gymnasts.

Track listing

Personnel
Credits adapted from Tidal.
  – producers, engineers, keyboards, mixers, programming
 Robin Schulz – producer, composer, lyricist, keyboards, programming
 Alessandra Günthardt – composer, lyricist
 Daniel Deimann – composer, lyricist
 Dennis Bierbrodt – composer
 Fredrik Samsson – composer, lyricist
 Guido Kramer – composer, lyricist
 Jürgen Dohr – composer, lyricist
 Oliver Lundström – composer, lyricist
 Stefan Dabruck – composer, lyricist
 Kiddo – composer, lyricist, featured artist, vocals
 Michael Schwabe – masterer

Charts

Weekly charts

Year-end charts

Certifications

References

2020 singles
2020 songs
Number-one singles in Poland
Robin Schulz songs
Songs written by Robin Schulz
Songs written by Jürgen Dohr